This article serves as an index - as complete as possible - of all the honorific orders or similar decorations received by the Belgian Royal Family, classified by continent, awarding country and recipient.

Belgium
 King Philippe: Became Grand Cordon of the Order of Leopold in 1990.
2013: Sovereign of the Order of Leopold
2013: Sovereign of the Order of the African Star (dormant), Order of the Lion (dormant), Order of the Crown and the Order of Leopold II.
 Queen Mathilde: 
2000: Grand Cordon of the Order of Leopold
 Princess Elisabeth, Duchess of Brabant:
2019: Grand Cordon of the Order of Leopold
 King Albert II: 
1993-2013: Sovereign of the Order of Leopold 
1993-2013: Sovereign of the Order of the African Star (dormant), Order of the Lion (dormant), Order of the Crown and the Order of Leopold II.
 Queen Paola: 
1994: Grand Cordon of the Order of Leopold
 Princess Astrid: 
1997: Grand Cordon of the Order of Leopold
 Prince Lorenz, Archduke of Austria-Este:
2000: Grand Cordon of the Order of Leopold
 Prince Laurent: 
1993: Grand Cordon of the Order of Leopold
 Princess Claire:
2004: Grand Cordon of the Order of Leopold

Europe

Denmark

 King Philippe: Knight of the Order of the Elephant
 Queen Mathilde:  Knight of the Order of the Elephant.
 King Albert II: Knight of the Order of the Elephant
 Queen Paola: Knight of the Order of the Elephant

Finland

 King Philippe: Grand Cross of the Order of the White Rose of Finland
 Queen Mathilde: Grand Cross of the Order of the White Rose of Finland
 King Albert II: Grand Cross with Collar of the Order of the White Rose of Finland
 Queen Paola: Grand Cross of the Order of the White Rose of Finland

Iceland
 King Albert II: Grand Cross of the Order of the Falcon

Norway

 King Philippe: Grand Cross of the Royal Norwegian Order of Saint Olav
 Queen Mathilde: Grand Cross of the Royal Norwegian Order of Saint Olav
 King Albert II: Grand Cross with Collar of the Royal Norwegian Order of Saint Olav
 Queen Paola: Grand Cross of the Royal Norwegian Order of Saint Olav
 Princess Astrid: Grand Cross of the Royal Norwegian Order of Merit
 Prince Lorenz, Archduke of Austria-Este: Grand Cross of the Royal Norwegian Order of Merit
 Prince Laurent: Grand Cross of the Royal Norwegian Order of Merit
 Princess Claire: Grand Cross of the Royal Norwegian Order of Merit

Sweden

 King Philippe: Knight of the Royal Order of the Seraphim
 Queen Mathilde: Commander Grand Cross of the Order of the Polar Star
 King Albert II: Knight with Collar of the Royal Order of the Seraphim
 Queen Paola: Member of the Royal Order of the Seraphim
 Princess Astrid: Commander Grand Cross of the Order of the Polar Star
 Prince Lorenz, Archduke of Austria-Este: Commander Grand Cross of the Order of the Polar Star
 Prince Laurent: Commander Grand Cross of the Order of the Polar Star

Estonia
 King Albert II: Collar of the Order of the Cross of Terra Mariana
 Queen Paola: Member 1st Class of the Order of the Cross of Terra Mariana

Latvia
 King Albert II: Commander Grand Cross with Chain of the Order of Three Stars
 Queen Paola: Commander Grand Cross of the Order of Three Stars

Lithuania
 King Philippe: Grand Cross with the Golden Chain of the Order of Vytautas the Great (24 October 2022)
 Queen Mathilde: Grand Cross of the Order of Vytautas the Great (24 October 2022)
 King Albert II: Grand Cross with the Golden Chain of the Order of Vytautas the Great (20 March 2006)
 Queen Paola: Grand Cross of the Order of Vytautas the Great (20 March 2006)

United Kingdom

 King Albert II: Honorary Knight Grand Cross of the Royal Victorian Order
 Recipient of Queen Elizabeth II Coronation Medal (2 June 1953)

Luxembourg

 King Philippe: Knight of the Order of the Gold Lion of the House of Nassau
 Queen Mathilde: 
 Grand Cross of the Order of Adolphe of Nassau
 Knight of the Order of the Gold Lion of the House of Nassau
 King Albert II: Knight of the Order of the Gold Lion of the House of Nassau
 Queen Paola: Knight of the Order of the Gold Lion of the House of Nassau
 Princess Astrid: Grand Cross of the Order of Adolphe of Nassau
 Prince Lorenz, Archduke of Austria-Este: Grand Cross of the Order of Adolphe of Nassau
 Prince Laurent: Grand Cross of the Order of Adolphe of Nassau

Netherlands

 King Philippe: 
 Knight Grand Cross of the Order of the Netherlands Lion, 2016
 Knight Grand Cross of the Order of Orange-Nassau
 Queen Mathilde: 
 Knight Grand Cross of the Order of the Netherlands Lion, 2016
 Knight Grand Cross of the Order of Orange-Nassau
 King Albert II: Knight Grand Cross of the Order of the Netherlands Lion
 Queen Paola:
 Knight Grand Cross of the Order of the Netherlands Lion
 Knight of the Order of the Gold Lion of the House of Nassau
 Princess Astrid: Grand Cross of the Order of the Crown
 Prince Lorenz, Archduke of Austria-Este: Grand Cross of the Order of the Crown
 Prince Laurent: Grand Cross of the Order of the Crown
 Princess Claire: Grand Cross of the Order of the Crown

Austria

Austrian republic
 King Philippe: Grand Star of the Decoration for Services to the Republic of Austria
 King Albert II: Grand Star of the Decoration for Services to the Republic of Austria
 Queen Paola: Grand Star of the Decoration for Services to the Republic of Austria

Austrian-Hungarian Imperial and Royal Family
 King Philippe: 1,328th Knight of the Austrian Order of the Golden Fleece
 King Albert II: 1,292nd Knight of the Austrian Order of the Golden Fleece
 Prince Lorenz, Archduke of Austria-Este: 1,285th Knight of the Austrian Order of the Golden Fleece

France

French republic
 King Philippe: Grand Cross of the Legion of Honour
 Queen Mathilde: Grand Cross of the Legion of Honour
 King Albert II: Grand Cross of the Legion of Honour
 Queen Paola: Grand Cross of the Order of National Merit

Bourbon-French Royal Family
 King Albert II: Knight of the Order of Saint Michael

Germany

 King Philippe: Grand Cross Special Class of the Order of Merit of the Federal Republic of Germany
 Queen Mathilde: Grand Cross Special Class of the Order of Merit of the Federal Republic of Germany
 King Albert II: Grand Cross Special Class of the Order of Merit of the Federal Republic of Germany
 Queen Paola: Grand Cross Special Class of the Order of Merit of the Federal Republic of Germany
 Princess Astrid: Grand Cross 1st Class of the Order of Merit of the Federal Republic of Germany
 Prince Lorenz, Archduke of Austria-Este: Grand Cross 1st Class of the Order of Merit of the Federal Republic of Germany
 Prince Laurent: Grand Cross 1st class of the Order of Merit of the Federal Republic of Germany

Greece
 King Philippe: 
Grand Cross of the Order of Honour
 Grand Cross of the Order of the Redeemer 2022
 Queen Mathilde:  Grand Cross of the Order of the Redeemer 2022
 King Albert II: Grand Cross of the Order of the Redeemer
 Queen Paola: Grand Cross of the Order of the Redeemer

Italy
 King Philippe: Knight Grand Cross with Collar of the Order of Merit of the Italian Republic (1 December 2021)
 King Albert II: Knight Grand Cross with Collar of the Order of Merit of the Italian Republic
 Queen Paola: Knight Grand Cross of the Order of Merit of the Italian Republic

Holy See

 King Albert II of Belgium : Knight Grand Cross of the Order of Pope Pius IX.
 Queen Paola: Recipient of the Pro Ecclesia et Pontifice

Vatican
 King Philippe: 
 Knight of the Order of the Holy Sepulchre
 Knight of the Collar of the Order of the Holy Sepulchre 2015
 Queen Mathilde: 
 Dame of the Order of the Holy Sepulchre
 Dame of the Collar of the Order of the Holy Sepulchre 2015
 King Albert II: Knight of the Collar of the Order of the Holy Sepulchre
 Queen Paola: Dame of the Collar of the Order of the Holy Sepulchre

Sovereign Military Order of Malta
 King Philippe: Knight Grand Cross of Honour and Devotion of the Sovereign Military Order of Malta, 3rd First Class
 King Albert II: Bailiff Knight Grand Cross of Honour and Devotion of the Sovereign Military Order of Malta, 3rd First Class
 Queen Paola: Dame Gran Cross of the Honour and Devotion of the Sovereign Military Order of Malta, 1st Class
 Prince Laurent: Knight of Honour and Devotion of the Sovereign Military Order of Malta, 3rd First Class

Monaco
 King Albert II: Knight Grand Cross of the Order of St. Charles

Portugal
 King Philippe:
 Grand Cross of the Order of Christ
 Grand Cross of the Order of Aviz
 Grand Collar of the Order of Prince Henry
 Queen Mathilde: 
 Grand Cross of the Order of Christ
 Grand Collar of the Order of Prince Henry
 King Albert II:
 Grand Cross of the Order of Aviz
 Grand Collar of the Order of Prince Henry
 Queen Paola: Grand Cross of the Order of Christ
 Princess Astrid: Grand Cross of the Order of Prince Henry
 Prince Lorenz, Archduke of Austria-Este: Grand Cross of the Order of Prince Henry
 Prince Laurent: Grand Cross of the Order of Prince Henry
 Princess Claire: Grand Cross of the Order of Prince Henry

Spain
 King Philippe: Knight Grand Cross of the Order of Isabella the Catholic
 Queen Mathilde: Dame Grand Cross of the Order of Isabella the Catholic
 King Albert II: 
 1,190th Knight of the Spanish Order of the Golden Fleece 
 Knight Grand Cross of the Order of Charles III
 Queen Paola: Dame Grand Cross of the Order of Charles III
 Princess Astrid: Knight Grand Cross of the Order of Civil Merit
 Prince Lorenz, Archduke of Austria-Este: Knight Grand Cross of the Order of Civil Merit
 Prince Laurent: Knight Grand Cross of the Order of Civil Merit

Bulgaria

 King Albert II: Sash of the Order of Stara Planina
 Queen Paola: Sash of the Order of Stara Planina

Hungary

 King Philippe: Grand Cross of the Order of Merit of the Republic of Hungary
 King Albert II: Grand Cross with Chain of the Order of Merit of the Republic of Hungary
 Princess Astrid: Grand Cross of the Order of Merit of the Republic of Hungary
 Prince Laurent: Grand Cross of the Order of Merit of the Republic of Hungary

Montenegrin Royal Family
 Prince Lorenz, Archduke of Austria-Este: Knight Grand Cross of the Order of Prince Danilo I

Poland

 King Philippe: 
 Grand Cross of the Order of Merit of the Republic of Poland
 Knight of the Order of the White Eagle
 Queen Mathilde: 
 Grand Cross of the Order of Merit of the Republic of Poland
 Knight of the Order of the White Eagle
 King Albert II: Knight of the Order of the White Eagle
 Queen Paola: Knight of the Order of the White Eagle

Romania

Romanian republic
 King Albert II: Collar of the Order of the Star of Romania
 Queen Paola: Grand Cross of the Order of the Star of Romania

Romanian Royal Family
 Prince Lorenz, Archduke of Austria-Este: Extra Knight Grand Cross of the Order of the Crown

Turkey 
 King Philippe: Member 1st Class of the Order of the State of Republic of Turkey

Africa

Cameroon 
 King Albert II : Grand Cordon  of the Order of Merit

Congo 
 King Albert II : Grand Cordon of the National Order of the Leopard

Ethiopia 
 King Albert II : Knight Collar of the Imperial Order of the Queen of Sheba

Gabon 
 King Albert II : Grand Cordon  of the Order of Merit

Morocco 
 King Albert II : Member Special Class of the Order of Muhammad (5 October 2004)
 Queen Paola : Member Special Class of the Order of Muhammad (5 October 2004)

Senegal 
 King Albert II : Grand Cordon of the National Order of Merit

Tunesia 
 King Albert II : Grand Cordon of the Order of the Republic

Asia

Japan
 King Philippe: Grand Cordon (22 October 1996) and Collar (11 October 2016) of the Order of the Chrysanthemum
 Queen Mathilde: Grand Cordon (Paulownia) of the Order of the Precious Crown (11 October 2016)
 King Albert II: Collar of the Order of the Chrysanthemum  (22 October 1996)
 Queen Paola: Grand Cordon (Paulownia) of the Order of the Precious Crown (22 October 1996)

Jordan
 King Philippe: Grand Cordon with Collar of the Order of al-Hussein bin Ali (18 May 2016)
 Queen Mathilde: Grand Cordon of the Supreme Order of the Renaissance (18 May 2016)

Malaysia 
 King Albert II : Grand Commander of the Most Esteemed Order of the Defender of the Realm

South Korea
 King Albert II : Grand Gwanghwa Medal of the Order of Diplomatic Service Merit

Iran 
 King Albert II : Grand Cordon of the Order of Pahlavi

South America

Argentina 
 King Philippe: Grand Cross of the Order of the Liberator General San Martin (1994)
 King Albert II: Grand Cross of the Order of the Liberator General San Martin

Bolivia 
 King Philippe: Grand Cross of the Order of the Condor of the Andes (1996)

Colombia 
 King Albert II: Grand Cross of the Order of Boyaca

Ecuador 
 King Albert II: Grand Cross of the National Order of San Lorenzo

Mexico 
 King Albert II: Grand Cross of the Order of the Aztec Eagle
 Princess Astrid, Archduchess of Austria-Este: Grand Cross with Collar of the Order of Miguel Hidalgo

Peru 
 King Albert II: Grand Cross of the Order of the Sun of Peru

Sources & Links

 Royal family's website, State visits in Belgium (French)
 Royal family's website, State visits abroad (French)
 Royal family's website, Audiences (French)

References 

Belgian monarchy
Orders, decorations, and medals of Belgium
Belgium